This article lists characters of Star Trek that received attention from third-party sources in their various canonical incarnations. This includes fictional major characters and fictional minor characters created for Star Trek, fictional characters not originally created for Star Trek, and real-life persons appearing in a fictional manner, such as holodeck recreations.

Characters from all series, listed alphabetically

Key

G

H

I

J

K

L

M

See also
 List of Star Trek characters A–F N–S T–Z
 List of recurring Star Trek: Deep Space Nine characters Enterprise The Next Generation The Original Series Voyager
 List of Star Trek episodes

References

G-M

de:Personen im Star-Trek-Universum
id:Daftar tokoh Star Trek